The Western New York Little Three Conference was an athletic conference that existed from 1946 to 1958. Its three member schools, Canisius College, Niagara University, and St. Bonaventure University, are Roman Catholic institutions located in Western New York.

Although the conference itself no longer exists, the three schools remain rivals and retain the use of the "Little Three" moniker when playing each other, especially in basketball. Niagara and Canisius are now in the Metro Atlantic Athletic Conference and St. Bonaventure resides in the Atlantic 10 Conference. The three schools also maintain a rivalry with the public University at Buffalo (of the Mid-American Conference), the only other Division I college in the region; the four-way rivalry by extension is known as the "Big 4," and all four teams have regularly scheduled each other as part of their non-conference schedules since UB returned to Division I in 1993.

Membership
 Canisius College (1946–1958), Jesuit school based in Buffalo, New York
 Niagara University (1946–1958), Vincentian school based in Lewiston, New York
 St. Bonaventure University (1946–1958), Franciscan school located near Olean, New York

Champions

Men's basketball
1947 Canisius
1948 Niagara
1949 Niagara
1950 Canisius/Niagara/St. Bonaventure
1951 St. Bonaventure
1952 DNP
1953 Niagara
1954 Niagara
1955 Niagara
1956 Canisius
1957 Canisius/St. Bonaventure
1958 St. Bonaventure

Football
1926 Niagara (2–0)
1931 St. Bonaventure (1–0–1)
1932 Niagara (2–0)
1933 St. Bonaventure (1–0–1)
1934 Canisius (2–0)
1935 St. Bonaventure (2–0)
1936 Canisius (2–0)
1938 Niagara (2–0)
1939 Canisius (2–0)
1940 Niagara (2–0)
1941 Canisius/St. Bonaventure (1–1)
1946 St. Bonaventure (2–0)
1947 Canisius (2–0)
1948 Canisius (2–0)
1949 Canisius/St. Bonaventure (2–1)

Canisius suspended its football team after the 1949 season, Niagara did the same in 1950, and St. Bonaventure also did so in 1951.  Canisius and Niagara reinstated their varsity football programs after the conference dissolved, then dissolved them permanently in 1987 and 2002, respectively.

External links
 https://www.sports-reference.com/cbb/conferences/WNY3/

 
1946 establishments in New York (state)
1958 disestablishments in New York (state)
Sports leagues established in 1946
Sports leagues disestablished in 1958